= Dareioukome =

Town of ancient Lydia

Coordinates: 38°36′24″N 27°37′27″E

Dareioukome was a town of ancient Lydia, inhabited during Hellenistic and Roman times.

Its site is located near Dereköy in Asiatic Turkey.
